Stage fright is the anxiety or fear felt by a person called upon to perform before an audience.

Stage fright or stagefright may also refer to:

Films
 Stage Fright (1923 film), an Our Gang short subject
 Stage Fright (1940 film), a Warner Bros. animated cartoon short directed by Chuck Jones
 Stage Fright (1950 film), directed by Alfred Hitchcock
 Nightmares (1980 film), also known as Stage Fright, directed by John D. Lamond
 Stage Fright (1987 film), an Italian horror film directed by Michele Soavi
 Stage Fright (1989 film), an independent film produced and directed by Brad Mays
 Stage Fright (1997 film), an animated short film by Steve Box which won a BAFTA in 1998
 Stage Fright (2014 film), a horror musical film directed by Jerome Sable
 Stage Fright (2017 film), an American made-for-TV thriller film starring Jordan Ladd

Music
 Stage Fright (album), a 1970 album by The Band
 "Stage Fright" (The Band song), the title song from the album
 "Stage Fright" (Chic song), a 1981 song by Chic
 Stage Fright (video), a 2005 DVD by Motörhead
 Stagefright (album), a 1980 album by Witchfynde
 "Stagefright", a song by Def Leppard on their 1983 album Pyromania
 "Stage Fright", a song by Blake McGrath on his 2010 album Time to Move

Television
 "Stage Fright" (Only Fools and Horses), a 1991 episode of the BBC situation comedy Only Fools and Horses
 "Stage Fright", an episode of Dollhouse

Other uses
 Stagefright (bug), a remotely exploitable software bug in the Android operating system
 Paruresis, also known as stage fright, a type of social anxiety disorder in which the sufferer is unable to urinate in the presence of others
 Stage Fright, a Justin Richards novel in the series The Invisible Detective
 Stage Fright, a book spin-off of Undercover Brothers (The Hardy Boys) and Girl Detective (Nancy Drew)